There were two general elections in Spain in 2019:
2019 Spanish general election may refer to:
 April 2019 Spanish general election, to elect the 13th Cortes Generales of the Kingdom of Spain
 November 2019 Spanish general election, to elect the 14th Cortes Generales of the Kingdom of Spain